Severe Cyclonic Storm Mora was a moderate but deadly tropical cyclone that caused widespread devastation and severe flooding in Sri Lanka, Andaman and Nicobar Islands, Bangladesh, Myanmar and Northeast India in May 2017. The second named storm of the 2017 annual cyclone season, Mora developed from an area of low pressure over the southeastern Bay of Bengal on May 28. The cyclone made landfall near Chittagong on the morning of May 30 and steadily weakened, dissipating early in the morning on May 31. Across its path, Mora dropped a large amount of rain, including 225mm of rainfall in Chittagong and northeast India. The storm is estimated to have caused damages nearing US$300 million.

The name Mora, suggested by Thailand, means agate.

Meteorological history

In late May 2017, an area of convection began to organize in the Bay of Bengal. Favorable conditions, characterized by low wind shear and warm sea surface temperatures, allowed for the development of rainbands and the beginnings of circulation on May 27. That same day, the India Meteorological Department (IMD) noted that there was a high likelihood that the low-pressure area would organize into a tropical depression. The Joint Typhoon Warning Center also issued a Tropical Cyclone Formation Alert on May 27, citing the persistent thunderstorm activity and the consolidating center of circulation. The Joint Typhoon Warning Center classified the disturbance as a tropical cyclone when the storm continued to intensify. The storm's motion was influenced primarily by a nearby subtropical ridge, forcing the system to take a north-northeasterly track.

Cloud tops over southeastern Bangladesh exceeded 15.3 km (9.5 miles), and over the Bay of Bengal cloud tops reached almost 16 km (9.9 miles). Animated enhanced infrared satellite imagery depicted improved consolidation with an eye feature on the morning of May 30.

Preparations

Bangladesh
With Mora's relatively rapid intensification, Bangladeshi authorities were hard pressed to carry out evacuations in preparation for the storm. Maritime weather alerts were issued for the Bangladeshi ports of Chittagong, Cox's Bazar, Mongla and Payra, under the anticipation of a  storm surge. All flights out of Shah Amanat International Airport were cancelled. Authorities attempted to evacuate 1 million people prior to landfall, however by May 29, only 300,000 had done so. Red Crescent volunteers and medical units were on alert as government offices in coastal zones closed. A meteorological office issued a warning for Chittagong and Cox's Bazar as the cyclonic storm Mora headed towards Bangladesh.

East and Northeast India
The India Meteorological Department issued Tropical cyclone warnings and watches for the Indian states of Mizoram, Nagaland, Manipur, West Bengal and Tripura. The Mizoram government expected that the cyclone could cause landslides and floods, so warnings were issued which advised residents to take precautions and preventive measures. The Indian Navy's Eastern fleet had was put on high alert to extend aid into Bangladesh.

Myanmar
The Myanmar Red Cross Society placed alerts in Chin, Rakhine, Magway, and Sagaing, and activated emergency response teams. Emergency response teams, as well as emergency volunteers from the community also assisted in the evacuation of those affected. The MRCS Emergency Operation Centre (EOC) was initiated on May 29, following the Standard Operating Procedures for MRCS disaster response. On May 30, the Emergency Task Force had its first meeting to plan for the response.

Impact

Bangladesh

A total of 500,000 people managed to move out of coastal areas before the storm made landfall on May 31. Strong winds and storm surge battered buildings and destroyed farmlands across Chittagong, Cox's Bazar, and Rangamati. At least 20,000 houses were damaged in refugee camps for Rohingya Muslims, who were displaced by conflict in neighboring Myanmar. As of May 31, 2017, nine people were reported to be killed across Bangladesh. In addition, 81 Bangladeshi fishermen were reported to be missing after the storm.

For two days, Mora dropped very heavy rainfall in Bangladesh. On May 30, rainfall of 225.2 mm was observed in Chittagong, 213 mm was observed over Sandwip, 208 mm over Sitakunda, and 187 mm over Rangamati. On May 31, rainfall of 196 mm over Netrokona and 139 mm over Hatiya was reported. Infrastructural loss ranged between ৳400–450 million (US$4.96–5.58 million).

Sri Lanka

Mora worsened ongoing floods in Sri Lanka by strengthening the southwest monsoon. Mora caused flooding and landslides throughout Sri Lanka in the final week of May 2017. 15 districts had been affected, killing 203 people and leaving 96 people missing. Damage reached US$197 million

Myanmar
Cyclone Mora made landfall in Myanmar in the early morning on May 30. The storm moved inland from the Bay of Bengal, and caused damage in the Arakan and Chin states. The cyclone destroyed 4,702 houses and damaged to 13,595 houses in Arakan State, Chin State and Irrawaddy Division. The government reported that 325 schools, 32 office buildings, and 57 religious buildings were entirely destroyed, while 429 non-residential buildings were heavily damaged. A number of other buildings were severely damaged, including 23 hospitals and clinics, 23 governmental buildings, three bridges, 38 utiliy poles and 22 motorboats.

An 11-year-old boy was killed by a tree branch that fell in Kutupalong refugee camp in Cox's Bazar. In Myanmar, a 10-year-old boy went missing after he was taken away by the rising waters. A tornado also formed in Rahkine which killed 2 and injured 6 people.

Bhutan
On May 31 at around 5 am the remnants of Cyclone Mora brought rainfall to 18 meteorological stations across Bhutan. The most recorded rainfall was 28.6mm, which was recorded in Dagana. No damage or deaths were reported in Bhutan.

Effects in Northeast India

Cyclone Mora caused severe flooding in the Indian states of Meghalaya, Assam, Manipur and Mizoram in northeast India.

Manipur
The loss of flooding in the state were about ₹1.31 billion (US$20.3 million).

Mizoram
Heavy rains caused by cyclone Mora hit the Indian state of Mizoram, disrupting power and telecommunications. About 20 houses were partially destroyed in the village of Khawbung, while the roof of a district hospital ward was swept away in Siaha district. Officials stated that the rain caused mudslides. An uprooted tree crushed a pastor's home in Serkawm village.

Assam
The Indian region of Assam on was hit by severe rainstorms due to Mora. The rain triggered floods that caused 59,000 families to abandon the flooded districts of Lakhimpur, Karimganj and Darrang. The storms devastated scores of homes.

Effects on Rohingya refugees
As of 2017, Bangladesh's border region is home to approximately 1,100,000 Rohingya refugees from Myanmar. When Cyclone Mora struck the islands of St. Martin and Teknaf, 200,000 people evacuated to shelters. 10,000 thatched huts in the Balukhali and Kutupalong camps were destroyed. Many Rohingya refugees did not abandon their makeshift shelters when the storm struck. One quarter of the buildings in the two camps had been damaged, including community and health centers. UN Women, in partnership with the Office of the United Nations High Commissioner for Refugees, helped to provide emergency shelters and other supports to ensure the safety and protection of thousands of women in the two Rohingya refugee camps in Cox's Bazar. The nation of Denmark donated 2.53 billion taka to the refugees.

Bangladesh
The United Nations High Commission for Refugees provided emergency hospital tents to the affected camps and aimed to provide waterproof plastic sheeting to affected families in Bangladesh. The International Organization for Migration provided shelter and emergency healthcare. The organization also supervised repairs to damaged health facilities and sanitation services. The World Food Program provided emergency food rations and large quantities of dry biscuits to affected residents, while the United Nations Children's Fund supplied hygiene kits, water purification tablets, and recreation kits for affected refugee children. The United Nations Population Fund provided high-quality medical care to pregnant women, new mothers and their newborn children in the camps.

The Singapore Red Cross (SRC) has contributed US$100,000 for those affected by Mora in Bangladesh. The humanitarian organization said it has contributed US$50,000 to the Bangladesh Red Crescent Society. The donation contributed water and sanitation for 50,000 victims of the cyclone.

Myanmar
The European Commission provided €1.5 million (US$1.67 million) in humanitarian aid funding for emergency relief assistance to populations in Myanmar affected by tropical Cyclone Mora. Singapore Red Cross provided US$50,000 to Myanmar Red Cross for the purchase of tarpaulins, CGI sheets, student and teacher kits for those affected in Myanmar.

Disaster Response

See also

Weather of 2017
Tropical cyclones in 2017
 1991 Bangladesh cyclone – a powerful cyclone that made landfall in Bangladesh in 1991, killing more than 138,000 people
 Cyclone Akash – a tropical cyclone that affected Bangladesh in 2007 and caused widespread impacts.
 Cyclone Sidr – a strong tropical cyclone that devastated the Ganga delta.
 Cyclone Roanu – a weak tropical cyclone that caused widespread impacts and severe flooding. 
 Cyclone Komen – an unusual tropical cyclone that originated in the Ganga delta and later struck the same region causing massive flooding.
 Tropical cyclones in Myanmar

References

External links

 02B.MORA from the U.S. Naval Research Laboratory

2017 North Indian Ocean cyclone season
Tropical cyclones in Bangladesh
Tropical cyclones in Myanmar
2017 in Bangladesh
Severe cyclonic storms
2017 in Sri Lanka
May 2017 events in Asia
Tropical cyclones in Sri Lanka
2017 in Myanmar
Tropical cyclones in 2017
2017 disasters in Asia